Catherine White (born 26 June 1965) is a former British swimmer who represented Great Britain at the 1984 Olympic Games and won a silver medal for England at the 1982 Commonwealth Games.

Early life
White was born in Portsmouth. She was raised in Barnard Castle, County Durham, and educated at Barnard Castle School.

International swimming career

At the 1982 Commonwealth Games in Brisbane, Australia she represented England in the 100 m and 200 m backstroke where she finished seventh and sixth respectively. She teamed up with Ann Osgerby, June Croft and Susannah Brownsdon for the women's 4×100 m medley relay where they finished in silver medal position behind Canada and ahead of Scotland in a time of 4:19.04.

At the 1984 Olympic Games in Los Angeles, California, United States, she participated in the 100 m and 200 m backstroke, reaching the 'B' final in both events.

White swam for England in the same two events two years later at the 1986 Commonwealth Games in Edinburgh, Scotland. She finished seventh in the 200 m backstroke final, but did not progress beyond the heats in the shorter event.

She won 1982 and 1983 ASA National Championship titles in the 100 metres backstroke and  the 200 metres backstroke.

References

Sources

1965 births
English female swimmers
Olympic swimmers of Great Britain
Swimmers at the 1984 Summer Olympics
Swimmers at the 1982 Commonwealth Games
Swimmers at the 1986 Commonwealth Games
Commonwealth Games silver medallists for England
Commonwealth Games medallists in swimming
Sportspeople from Portsmouth
Living people
People educated at Barnard Castle School
Medallists at the 1982 Commonwealth Games